Flower is an unincorporated community in Braxton County, West Virginia, United States.

The community was formerly known as Waldeck.

References

Unincorporated communities in Braxton County, West Virginia
Unincorporated communities in West Virginia